The 1975 EuroHockey Club Champions Cup was the second official edition of Europe's premier field hockey club competition. It took place in Frankfurt, where it was won once again by hosts SC 1880 Frankfurt - the last of five titles in a row.

Standings
  SC 1880 Frankfurt
  Royal Léopold Club
  Southgate HC
  SV Kampong
  Rot-Weiss Köln
  Club Egara
  Edinburgh HC
  HK Suboticanka
  Rot-Weiss Wettingen
  Bohemians Prague
  Lyon
  Wien

References
  European Hockey Federation

EuroHockey Club Champions Cup
International field hockey competitions hosted by Germany
EuroHockey Club Champions Cup
EuroHockey Club Champions Cup
1975 in European sport